Elateia or Elatia, also Elatreia or Elatria (Ἐλατρία), was a town of the Cassopaei in Thesprotia, in ancient Epirus, mentioned by Strabo, along with Batiae and Pandosia. It is said to have been a colony of Elis (in the Peloponnese, Greece).

Its location is believed to be at the foot of Mount Zalongo, north of the modern village of Paliorophoro. This site was settled from prehistoric times.

References

See also
List of cities in ancient Epirus

Populated places in ancient Epirus
Greek colonies
Former populated places in Greece
Elean colonies